Michael Slattery (1783–1857) was a Roman Catholic clergyman who served as the Archbishop of Cashel & Emly from 1833 to 1857.

He was born at Tipperary Town in Ireland in 1783, and was educated at the Abbey School there. He entered Trinity College Dublin when only fifteen years of age, one of the first Catholics to do so, earning a Bachelor of Arts degree in 1804.

He then decided to become a Roman Catholic priest, and was enrolled at the St. Patrick's, Carlow College. He was ordained in 1809, and continued at Carlow as a professor of philosophy and of Moral Theology.

As a priest, Father Slattery served the parishes of Ulla in County Limerick for two years, and Borrisoleigh in County Tipperary for over twenty years.

In 1832 he we elected president of the St Patrick's College, Maynooth; in 1833 he was elected to succeed Archbishop Robert Laffan as head of the Roman Catholic Archdiocese of Cashel and Emly, and was installed at Thurles Cathedral on 24 February 1834.

Slattery was a moderate Nationalist and supported Daniel O'Connell, but also spoke out against more militant nationalism.

In 1842 Slattery established a foreign mission department in St. Patrick's College, Thurles.

Archbishop Slattery died at Thurles on 4 February 1857.

The Michael Slattery Lecture Series
The Michael Slattery Lectures series is held by Carlow College in association with Trinity College Dublin, recognising his connection to both institutions. Participants from the Departments of History, English, History of Art and Architecture from Trinity and the Humanities Department at Carlow College attend.
 Re-interpreting Rebellion in Irish History, The Michael Slattery Lectures, 2008.
 Irish Reputations, The Michael Slattery Lectures, 2009.

References

1783 births
1857 deaths
19th-century Roman Catholic archbishops in Ireland
People from County Tipperary
Alumni of Trinity College Dublin
Alumni of Carlow College
Academics of St. Patrick's, Carlow College
Presidents of St Patrick's College, Maynooth
Roman Catholic archbishops of Cashel
People educated at The Abbey School (Tipperary)